Kesivan Dev Naidoo (born 25 June 1979) is a South African drummer, who plays predominantly jazz, electronica and world music.

Musical studies

1979 – 1995

Born in East London, Kesivan was the first child in a family of 2 children. His parents, Dev and Vinodrie Naidoo, worked as a building constructor and Assistant Accountant/Human Resources Administrator respectively and sent Kesivan to St. Ann's Primary School at the age of 5. He later graduated from Hudson Park High School in 1996. His mum played the piano until her matric year.

Kesivan first got into drumming in 1990, at the age of 11. While waiting to be let into his aunt's house, he heard his aunt's boyfriend (Reese Timothy) playing drums over the music. What he heard excited him, and this convinced him to become a drummer. Three years later, in 1993, Kesivan played his onstage debut at the Hogsback Arts Festival in the Eastern Cape. From age 16 and while still in High School he joined Eldon Swing and Jazz Band in East London, playing mainly Swing.

In 1994 Kesivan was approached by Alan Webster, who invited him to join his Quintet.
Shortly after he began to play for Hudson Park Jazz Band, as well as the Hudson Concert Band which later did a tour of Germany, France and England. When he was 15 Kesivan took some lessons with world-class drumming and jazz musician Lulu Gontsana at the Grahamstown Arts Festival. These lessons would continue for two years.

In 1995, 1999 and 2000 Kesivan was chosen for the National Youth Big Band, with whom he later toured New York.

1996 – present

In 1996 Kesivan joined the Hotep Galeta Trio. Galeta, who had a big influence on Kesivan's musical style, convinced him to study at the University of Cape Town in 1997. Four years later he graduated with a Bachelor of Music, and with a First Class Honors in 2002.

At the beginning of the millennium Kesivan became the youngest person to win the Southern African Music Rights Organisation SAMRO Overseas Scholarship Competition. Given this opportunity to study abroad, he chose to study under Sitar guru, Professor Sanjay Bandophadyah in India. He later completed his master's degree in tabla and percussion.

Since 2006, Kesivan collaborates with Swiss Drummer Lucas Niggli, and is a member of BEAT BAG BOHEMIA, a drum quartet with Rolando Lamussene, Peter Conradin Zumthor and Lucas Niggli. They performed over 30 concerts, in Switzerland, Germany, Poland, Mocambique and South Africa, played at Festivals such as Kraków, Cape Town and Zürich. The CD was released on INTAKT records.

Musical style

Kesivan has played a wide variety of genres over the years, and has played with many greats such as Miriam Makeba, Selelo Selota, Feya Faku, Bheki Mseleku, Jimmi Dlulu and Marcus Wyatt. He is current playing with Tribe, Babu, Restless Natives and Closet Snare, all of whom have been met with acclaim.

Tribe

Playing with Charles Lazar (bass), Mark Fransman (piano) and Buddy Wells (sax), Kesivan and Tribe have become known for their "instantly South African flavored, hard-edged, straight-ahead jazz sounds."

In July 2002 they were invited to play in the original North Sea Jazz Festival in The Hague, and where the first unrecorded and unsigned band to play at the festival.

They later recorded one CD – Our Language..

Closet Snare

Closet Snare is a 6 piece group with Mark Buchanan (Guitar/Samples), DJ Sibot (Machines/Decks), Lee Thomson (Trumpet), Sean Ou Tim (Bass) and Inka Kendzia – VJ Grrrl (Visuals). They perform what Tim describes as "free and improvised electronica music", which draws a diverse crowd of indie, drum 'n bass, jazz, electronica, classical and punk lovers.

They played at the North Sea Jazz Festival at Cape Town in 2007 and are due to release a CD.

Musical influences

Kesivan has been influenced by a wide variety and musicians and bands. Of the more contemporary artists, he cites Feya Faku, Hotep Galeta, Bheki Mseleku, Charles Lazar, Jojo Mayer, Prince, Rage Against the Machine and all the members of Tribe, Closet Snare and Babu.

Other influences included drummers such as Elvin Jones, Max Roach, Tony Williams and the drummers who have played for James Brown.

Other musicians who have influenced his compositions include Wayne Shorter, Miles Davis and John Coltrane.

Contemporary ventures

In 2006 Kesivan started a company with Thomson, and called it "Silent Revolution Productions".
They are the new owners of the Armchair Theater in Observatory in Cape town, which has been an established music venue since 1999.
Silent Revolution Productions hope to make more people aware of Art Music in South Africa through this venue.

Notes

References

 van Dyk, Gary (29 April 2006) "Build-up to a hot season" The Good Weekend
 Keylock, Miles (20 July 2007) "Keeping nothing in the closet" Mail & Guardian
 Milton, Even (18 July 2007) "Sounds straight out of a Closet" Cape Argus, p. 7.
 Mayne, Jane (20 July 2007) "Jazz heads who don't swing to the riff raff" Cape Times
 Stent, Sebastian (29 April 2006) "Time for the real stars to stand up" The Good Weekend, p. 3.
 "Intense stage energy" (2 February 2005) The Daily Dispatch
 "Priority – The Score" (June/July 2006) Absolute Cape Town, p. 85.
 "The Art of Improvisation" (May 2007) GQ Magazine

1979 births
Living people
South African drummers
21st-century drummers